Jennifer Mason may refer to:
Jennifer Mason (sociologist), British sociologist
Jennifer Mason (Haven), fictional character
 Jennifer Mason (Shortland Street), fictional character
 Jennifer Mason, fictional character in The Following